Florence Foster Jenkins is a 2016 biographical film directed by Stephen Frears and written by Nicholas Martin and Julia Kogan. It stars Meryl Streep as Florence Foster Jenkins, a New York heiress known for her generosity and poor singing. Hugh Grant plays her manager and long-time companion, St. Clair Bayfield. Other cast members include Simon Helberg, Rebecca Ferguson, and Nina Arianda.

Filming began in May 2015, and the premiere was held in London on 12 April 2016. The film was released on 6 May 2016 in the United Kingdom, 13 July in France and 12 August in the United States. At the 89th Academy Awards, it was nominated for Best Costume Design and earned Streep her 20th nomination for Best Actress. It received four Golden Globe nominations, including Best Picture.

Plot
In 1944, Florence Foster Jenkins is a New York City socialite heiress who founded the Verdi Club to celebrate her love of music. St. Clair Bayfield, a British Shakespearean actor, is her manager and long-time companion. Florence lives in a grand hotel suite, while Bayfield lives in an apartment with his mistress, Kathleen Weatherley. Florence suffers from long-term syphilis, contracted from her first husband.

Florence decides to resume singing lessons after she sees Lily Pons in concert with Bayfield. She hires pianist Cosmé McMoon, who is shocked by her terrible singing, but Bayfield and vocal coach Carlo Edwards, the assistant conductor at the Metropolitan Opera, pretend she is wonderful. Bayfield warns McMoon of dire consequences if he criticizes her.

Bayfield arranges a small recital, handpicking the attendees. Loyal Verdi Club members watch respectfully, but others barely contain their laughter. Encouraged by her good reviews, she arranges to make a recording at Melotone as a Christmas gift for members of the Verdi Club. Florence gives McMoon a copy and recalls that Bayfield was an unsuccessful actor and that she hid negative reviews from him. She also informs McMoon of her history as a piano player and teacher, having once played for the President as a child. McMoon realizes that Florence is not as musically inept as he had thought.

Florence and McMoon write and perform original songs together. One song is broadcast on the radio, to the horror of Bayfield and Kathleen, though many listeners find it comedic and enjoy it. Florence informs Bayfield that she has booked Carnegie Hall for a performance and will give away a thousand tickets to soldiers. Bayfield fails to dissuade her. He gets into a fight with a group of men laughing at Florence and McMoon's song at a bar. Kathleen, resenting the lack of attention, leaves him.

McMoon confides to Bayfield that he fears that the recital will humiliate him and ruin his career. Bayfield replies that he gave up his acting career to support his wife and urges McMoon do the same for his friend. With Bayfield playing emotional blackmail on McMoon's every heartstring, McMoon reluctantly agrees to accompany Florence, though fully expecting to flop spectacularly at Carnegie Hall.

The concert is packed and attended by celebrities such as Cole Porter and Tallulah Bankhead. McMoon arrives late which unnerves Florence, but Bayfield and McMoon encourage her to go on – Florence then writes McMoon into her will backstage before the two go out onto the stage. When Florence begins singing, the soldiers laugh and shout. Her supporters and friends, however, scold them and cheer for her to keep singing. She continues her performance. However, New York Post columnist Earl Wilson tells Bayfield he will write a damning review and refuses his bribes.

Bayfield, with McMoon's help, buys every copy of the New York Post in the neighborhood and throws them away. Despite their best efforts Florence hears about the review, retrieves a copy of the review from a trash can, and is so upset she collapses and becomes severely ill. As she is dying in bed, Florence imagines herself singing beautiful opera, and takes a bow with McMoon and Bayfield to a standing ovation. She tells Bayfield that though people may say she could not sing, no one can say she did not sing.

Cast

 Meryl Streep as Florence Foster Jenkins
 Hugh Grant as St. Clair Bayfield
 Simon Helberg as Cosmé McMoon
 Rebecca Ferguson as Kathleen Weatherley
 Nina Arianda as Agnes Stark
 Stanley Townsend as Phineas Stark
 Allan Corduner as John Totten
 Christian McKay as Earl Wilson
 David Haig as Carlo Edwards
 John Sessions as Dr. Hermann
 Bríd Brennan as Kitty
 John Kavanagh as Arturo Toscanini
 Pat Starr as Gertrude Vanderbilt Whitney
 Maggie Steed as Mrs. James O'Flaherty
 Thelma Barlow as Mrs. Oscar Garmunder
 Liza Ross as Mrs. E.E. Patterson
 Paola Dionisotti as Baroness Le Feyre
 Rhoda Lewis as Mrs. Patsy Snow
 Aida Garifullina as Lily Pons
 Nat Luurtsema as Tallulah Bankhead
 Ewan Stewart as Colonel
 Mark Arnold as Cole Porter

Production

Development
Prior to reading the Nicholas Martin and Julia Kogan script, Frears did not have much knowledge about Jenkins beyond the portrayal of her in the West End play Glorious! by Peter Quilter. On the strength of the script, Frears became interested and did research by watching various YouTube videos of her. Upon watching the videos Frears noted that "You’re laughing and she touches you. It’s inherently ridiculous and courageous at the same time." He and Streep were determined that despite the subject matter the audience should side with Florence. Frears did not envisage Streep in the role but after her name was brought up Frears agreed, noting that he thought it would be something fresh for her. Streep worked with a singing coach to help her prepare for the role of Jenkins. Frears praised her performance, stating "You can only sing badly if you are a good singer."

Casting
On 27 March 2015, Simon Helberg was set to play Cosmé McMoon, a pianist and the accompanist to Jenkins. Rebecca Ferguson was added to the cast on 1 April 2015. On 13 April 2015, Nina Arianda joined the film to play Agnes Stark, a showgirl struggling to move up into high society with the help of her husband.

Filming
Principal photography on the film began in May 2015 in London. Pathé released a first-look photo on 22 May, featuring Streep and Grant as Jenkins and Bayfield, respectively. Filming was done in Hoylake and Liverpool city centre.

Filming took place in Liverpool and the city was transformed into 1940s New York City, with Liverpool's Drury Lane being turned into Central Park West, where Streep and Grant were spotted filming in June 2015. Production concluded on 20 July 2015.

Release
In September 2015, Paramount Pictures acquired U.S distribution rights to the film. The film had its world premiere at the Belfast Film Festival on 23 April 2016. The film was theatrically released in the United Kingdom on 6 May 2016 and in the United States on 12 August 2016.

Florence Foster Jenkins was released on Digital HD on 29 November 2016 and on Blu-ray and DVD on 13 December 2016.

Reception

Box office
, Florence Foster Jenkins had grossed $27.4 million in North America and $28.6 million in other territories, for a worldwide total of $56 million.

In the United States and Canada, Florence Foster Jenkins was released on 12 August 2016, against Pete's Dragon and Sausage Party, and was projected to gross $5–7 million from 1,500 theaters in its opening weekend. It went on to open to $6.6 million, finishing 8th at the box office.

Critical response
On Rotten Tomatoes, the film has an approval rating of 87%, based on 229 reviews, with an average rating of 7.13/10. The site's critical consensus reads, "Florence Foster Jenkins makes poignant, crowd-pleasing dramedy out of its stranger-than-fiction tale – and does its subject justice with a reliably terrific turn from star Meryl Streep." On Metacritic, the film has a score of 71 out of 100, based on 41 critics, indicating "generally favorable reviews". Audiences polled by CinemaScore gave the film an average grade of "A−" on an A+ to F scale.

Wai Chee Dimock, writing in the Los Angeles Review of Books, linked the film to Hamlet and The Magic Flute, saying that the film "is neither tragedy nor farce, but a passable admixture of the two, defining both negatively."

Accolades

See also
 Marguerite, a 2015 French film inspired by the life of Jenkins
 Ironweed, a 1987 film in which Meryl Streep plays a character who also imagines herself a much more gifted singer than she is shown to truly be
 Glorious!, the Olivier Award-nominated 2005 West End stage comedy about Jenkins by Peter Quilter
 Souvenir, two-character play with music about Jenkins and McMoon starring Judy Kaye, written by Stephen Temperley

References

External links
  Official US website
 
 Florence Foster Jenkins review by Paul Heath, webpage
 
 
 

2016 films
2010s English-language films
2010s biographical films
2010s historical comedy-drama films
French biographical films
French historical comedy-drama films
British biographical films
British historical comedy-drama films
BAFTA winners (films)
Biographical films about singers
Comedy-drama films based on actual events
Cultural depictions of Cole Porter
Films about opera
Films set in 1944
Films directed by Stephen Frears
Films scored by Alexandre Desplat
British films set in New York City
French films set in New York City
Films shot in London
Films shot in Merseyside
Films shot in England
BBC Film films
Pathé films
Qwerty Films films
2010s British films
2010s French films